Macroglossum is a genus of moths in the family Sphingidae. The genus was erected by Giovanni Antonio Scopoli in 1777.

Species

Macroglossum adustum Rothschild & Jordan, 1916
Macroglossum aesalon Mabille, 1879
Macroglossum affictitia Butler, 1875
Macroglossum albigutta Rothschild & Jordan, 1903
Macroglossum albolineata Clark, 1935
Macroglossum alcedo Boisduval, 1832
Macroglossum alluaudi de Joannis, 1893
Macroglossum amoenum Rothschild & Jordan, 1903
Macroglossum aquila Boisduval, 1875
Macroglossum arimasi Hogenes & Treadaway, 1993
Macroglossum assimilis Swainson, 1821
Macroglossum augarra Rothschild, 1904
Macroglossum avicula Boisduval, 1875
Macroglossum backi Eitschberger, 2009
Macroglossum belis (Linnaeus, 1758)
Macroglossum bifasciata (Butler, 1875)
Macroglossum bombylans Boisduval, 1875
Macroglossum buini Clark, 1926
Macroglossum buruensis Holland, 1900
Macroglossum cadioui Schnitzler & Speidel, 2004
Macroglossum caldum Jordan, 1926
Macroglossum calescens Butler, 1882
Macroglossum castaneum Rothschild & Jordan, 1903
Macroglossum clemensi Cadiou, 1998
Macroglossum corythus Walker, 1856
Macroglossum dohertyi Rothschild, 1894
Macroglossum divergens Walker, 1856
Macroglossum eggeri Eitschberger, 2003
Macroglossum eichhorni Rothschild & Jordan, 1903
Macroglossum faro (Cramer, 1779)
Macroglossum fischeri Eitschberger, 2009
Macroglossum fritzei Rothschild & Jordan, 1903
Macroglossum fruhstorferi Huwe, 1895
Macroglossum glaucoptera Butler, 1875
Macroglossum godeffroyi (Butler, 1882)
Macroglossum gyrans Walker, 1856
Macroglossum haslami Clark, 1922
Macroglossum haxairei Eitschberger, 2003
Macroglossum hemichroma Butler, 1875
Macroglossum hirundo Boisduval, 1832
Macroglossum incredibile Eitschberger, 2006
Macroglossum insipida Butler, 1875
Macroglossum jani Hogenes & Treadaway, 1998
Macroglossum joannisi Rothschild & Jordan, 1903
Macroglossum kadneri Eitschberger, 2004
Macroglossum kishidai Cadiou, 1998
Macroglossum kitchingi Cadiou, 1997
Macroglossum kleineri Eitschberger, 2006
Macroglossum lepidum Rothschild & Jordan, 1915
Macroglossum leytensis Eitschberger, 2006
Macroglossum limata C. Swinhoe, 1892
Macroglossum luteata Butler, 1875
Macroglossum malitum Zwick & Treadaway, 2001
Macroglossum marquesanum Collenette, 1935
Macroglossum mediovitta Rothschild & Jordan, 1903
Macroglossum meeki Rothschild & Jordan, 1903
Macroglossum melanoleuca Cadiou & Schnitzler, 2001
Macroglossum melas Rothschild & Jordan, 1903
Macroglossum micacea Walker, 1856
Macroglossum milvus (Boisduval, 1833)
Macroglossum mitchellii Boisduval, 1875
Macroglossum moecki Rutimeyer, 1969
Macroglossum mouldsi Lachlan & Kitching, 2001
Macroglossum multifascia Rothschild & Jordan, 1903
Macroglossum napolovi Eitschberger, 2004
Macroglossum nemesis Cadiou, 1998
Macroglossum neotroglodytus Kitching & Cadiou, 2000
Macroglossum nigellum Rothschild & Jordon, 1916
Macroglossum nubilum Rothschild & Jordan, 1903
Macroglossum nycteris Kollar, 1844
Macroglossum oceanicum Rothschild & Jordan, 1915
Macroglossum pachycerus Rothschild & Jordan, 1903
Macroglossum palawana Eitschberger & Treadaway, 2004
Macroglossum particolor Rothschild & Jordan, 1903
Macroglossum passalus (Drury, 1773)
Macroglossum paukstadtorum Eitschberger, 2005
Macroglossum perplexum Eitschberger, 2003
Macroglossum phocinum Rothschild & Jordan, 1903
Macroglossum poecilum Rothschild & Jordan, 1903
Macroglossum prometheus Boisduval, 1875
Macroglossum pseudocorythus Eitschberger, 2003
Macroglossum pseudoluteata Eitschberger, 2003
Macroglossum pseudonigellum Eitschberger, 2006
Macroglossum pyrrhosticta Butler, 1875
Macroglossum queenslandi Clark, 1927
Macroglossum rectans Rothschild & Jordan, 1903
Macroglossum regulus Boisduval, 1875
Macroglossum reithi Cadiou, 1997
Macroglossum ronja Eitschberger, 2009
Macroglossum saga Butler, 1878
Macroglossum schnitzleri Cadiou, 1998
Macroglossum semifasciata Hampson, 1893
Macroglossum sitiene Walker, 1856
Macroglossum soror Rothschild & Jordan, 1903
Macroglossum spilonotum Rothschild & Jordon, 1912
Macroglossum stellatarum (Linnaeus, 1758)
Macroglossum stenoxanthum Turner, 1925
Macroglossum stevensi Clark, 1935
Macroglossum stigma Rothschild & Jordan, 1903
Macroglossum sulai Eitschberger, 2003
Macroglossum svetlana Eitschberger & Fischer, 2009
Macroglossum sylvia Boisduval, 1875
Macroglossum tangalleum Eitschberger & Schnitzler, 2006
Macroglossum tenebrosa Lucas, 1891
Macroglossum tenimberi Clark, 1920
Macroglossum trigi Eitschberger, 2004
Macroglossum trochilus (Hübner, 1823)
Macroglossum ungues Rothschild & Jordan, 1903
Macroglossum vacillans Walker, 1865
Macroglossum vadenberghi Hogenes, 1984
Macroglossum variegatum Rothschild & Jordan, 1903
Macroglossum vicinum Jordan, 1923
Macroglossum vidua Rothschild & Jordan, 1903
Macroglossum wolframmeyi Eitschberger & Treadaway, 2004

Gallery

External links
 

 
Moth genera
Taxa named by Giovanni Antonio Scopoli